Province of the Islands can refer to:
 Provincia Insularum, a late Roman/Byzantine province
 Eyalet of the Archipelago, Ottoman province